Kapel is a hamlet in the Dutch province of Gelderland. It is located in the municipality of Lingewaard, about 1 km north of the town of Gendt.

It was first mentioned in 1840 as Capel, and means chapel, i.e. church without an independent parish. Kapel is not a statistical entity, and the postal authorities have placed it under Gendt. In 1840, it was home to 206 people. Nowadays, it consists of about 45 houses.

References

Populated places in Gelderland
Lingewaard